Werner Bochmann (17 May 1900, Meerane, Kingdom of Saxony – 3 June 1993) was a German composer.

Selected filmography
 Playing with Fire (1934)
 The Island (1934)
 One Too Many on Board (1935)
 Punks Arrives from America (1935)
 Fruit in the Neighbour's Garden (1935)
 Thunder, Lightning and Sunshine (1936)
 The Amazing Quest of Ernest Bliss (1936)
 The Grey Lady (1937)
 Alarm in Peking (1937)
 The Citadel of Warsaw (1937)
 Between the Parents (1938)
 The Marriage Swindler (1938)
 I Love You (1938)
 The Girl of Last Night (1938)
 Who's Kissing Madeleine? (1939)
 Detours to Happiness (1939)
 Congo Express (1939)
 My Aunt, Your Aunt (1939)
 A German Robinson Crusoe (1940)
 Happiness is the Main Thing (1941)
 Quax the Crash Pilot (1941)
 Sky Hounds (1942)
 Front Theatre (1942)
 Melody of a Great City (1943)
 Sophienlund (1943)
 The Green Salon (1944)
 The Black Robe (1944)
 Young Hearts (1944)
 Quax in Africa (1947)
 Everything Will Be Better in the Morning (1948)
 Search for Majora (1949)
 Everything for the Company (1950)
 Theodore the Goalkeeper (1950)
 Trouble in Paradise (1950)
 My Friend the Thief (1951)
 The Blue and White Lion (1952)
 Roses Bloom on the Moorland (1952)
 Elephant Fury (1953)
 The Mill in the Black Forest (1953)
 Ball of Nations (1954)
 The Little Town Will Go to Sleep (1954)
 The Fisherman from Heiligensee (1955)
 The Forest House in Tyrol (1955)
 The Spanish Fly (1955)
 Two Bavarians in St. Pauli (1956)
 Between Munich and St. Pauli (1957)

External links

1900 births
1993 deaths
20th-century German composers
German film score composers
Male film score composers
Officers Crosses of the Order of Merit of the Federal Republic of Germany
People from Meerane
People from the Kingdom of Saxony
20th-century German male musicians